St. Andrew's Church (Danish: Sankt Andreas Kirke) is a Lutheran church on Gothersgade in Copenhagen, Denmark, which was designed by the architect Martin Borch and built from 1897 to 1901. It is a parish church within the Danish National Church.

History

Architecture
St. Andrew's is a two nave church oriented with the choir to the west and the main entrance to the east. The tower is located at the south-east corner of the building. Its style is mainly inspired by Danish brick architecture of the late Romanesque period. The portal is inspired by Jutland granite portals, with three pairs af columns and corbels shaped as lions. The latter were designed by Anders Bundgaard, known as the creator of the Gefion Fountain at Langelinie, while Thomas Bærentsen designed a number of reliefs including a circular relief of St. Andrew on the north wall of the nave. The lateral nave on the south side has three pointed gables.

References

External links
 Official website

Lutheran churches in Copenhagen
Copenhagen Andrews Church
Copenhagen Andrews Church
Martin Borch buildings
20th-century churches in Denmark